The 2019 Conference USA women's soccer tournament was the postseason women's soccer tournament for Conference USA held from November 6 through November 10, 2019. The seven-match tournament took place at Mean Green Soccer Complex in Denton, Texas. The eight-team single-elimination tournament consisted of three rounds based on seeding from regular season conference play. The defending champions were the North Texas Mean Green, who defended their title after defeating the Florida Atlantic Owls in the final. The conference championship was the fourth for the North Texas women's soccer program, all four of which have come under the direction of head coach John Hedlund.

Bracket

Source:

Schedule

Quarterfinals

Semifinals

Final

Statistics

Goalscorers 
3 Goals
 Allie Byrd (North Texas)
 Berklee Peters (North Texas)

2 Goals
 Peyton DePriest (Middle Tennessee)
 Megan Greene (Charlotte)
 Elisha Holmes (Florida Atlantic)
 Haley Kostyshyn (Rice)
 Ashton McKane (Charlotte)

1 Goal
 Chandler Backes (Western Kentucky)
 Logan Bruffett (North Texas)
 Tiril Haga (Florida Atlantic)
 Madison Kent (Rice)
 Olivia Klein (North Texas)
 Ari Maibodi (Charlotte)
 Lianne Mananquil (Rice)
 Natalie Newell (North Texas)
 Mary O'Hara (Florida Atlantic)
 Desiree Ramirez (North Texas)
 Jackie Soto (UTEP)
 Pernille Velta (Florida Atlantic)
 Sammy Vitols (Florida Atlantic)

All-Tournament team

Source:

Note: Offensive MVP shown in bold, defensive MVP shown in italics.

See also 
 2019 Conference USA Men's Soccer Tournament

References 

Conference USA Women's Soccer Tournament
2019 Conference USA women's soccer season